Omer Joldić (born 1 January 1977) is a Bosnian professional football manager and former player who is the manager of Bosna Visoko.

International career
Joldić made his debut for Bosnia and Herzegovina in a February 1997 Dunhill Cup match against Zimbabwe and has earned a total of 21 caps, scoring 1 goal. His final international was an August 2001 LG Cup match against South Africa.

Career statistics

International goals
Scores and results list Bosnia and Herzegovina's goal tally first.

Honours

Player
Željezničar 
Bosnian Premier League: 2000–01
Bosnian Cup: 2000–01
Bosnian Supercup: 2000

Olimpik  
First League of FBiH: 2008–09

References

External links

1977 births
Living people
Sportspeople from Tuzla
Association football midfielders
Bosnia and Herzegovina footballers
Bosnia and Herzegovina international footballers
FK Sloboda Tuzla players 
FK Željezničar Sarajevo players
FC Saturn Ramenskoye players
GKS Bełchatów players
FK Olimpik players
Premier League of Bosnia and Herzegovina players
Russian Premier League players
Ekstraklasa players
First League of the Federation of Bosnia and Herzegovina players 
Bosnia and Herzegovina expatriate footballers
Expatriate footballers in Russia
Bosnia and Herzegovina expatriate sportspeople in Russia
Expatriate footballers in Poland
Bosnia and Herzegovina expatriate sportspeople in Poland
Bosnia and Herzegovina football managers